The Fortescue railway, owned and operated by Fortescue Metals Group (FMG), is a private rail network in the Pilbara region of Western Australia built to carry iron ore. It opened in 2008. When it was completed, it was the heaviest haul railway in the world, designed for 40 tonne axle loads, 2.5 to 5 tonnes heavier than the other Pilbara iron ore rail systems. On 4 November 2014, FMG Rail commenced trialling 42-tonne axle loads.

In addition to the FMG line, a number of other networks operate in the region. Rio Tinto operate the Hamersley & Robe River railway, BHP operates the Goldsworthy and Mount Newman railways and Hancock Prospecting the Roy Hill railway.

History

FMG originally planned to use the existing railway lines, owned and operated by BHP and Rio Tinto, to develop its Cloud Break mine deposit. Lengthy legal battles however forced the company to spend A$2.5 billion to construct its own line.

Construction on the  line from the Cloud Break mine to the Herb Elliott Port at Port Hedland commenced in November 2006. The line was scheduled to be fully operational within 18 months, but a cyclone in March 2007 killed two workers at the project and led to delays. The first train from the mine to the port ran on 5 April 2008. In December 2012, the line was extended to the new Solomon Mine.

The journey from mine to port takes approximately five hours, and on average fourteen trains are operated per day. The line is open-access, meaning Fortescue is willing to allow other mining companies to use it for their operations.

BHP & Rio Tinto railway use
Before deciding to construct its own line, in June 2004 FMG lodged an application with the National Competition Council of Australia to use part of the Goldsworthy and Mount Newman railways.

In June 2010, the Australian Competition Tribunal ruled that FMG be granted access to Rio Tinto's Robe River line and BHP's Billiton's Goldsworthy line but not to the busier Hamersley and Mount Newman lines. Treasurer Wayne Swan suggested that several advantages would accrue from access to the rail lines by third parties. It would increase competition, reduce duplication of infrastructure, and reduce environmental damage.

Access to the rail networks by third parties is governed by the State Agreements Act.

In November 2010, BC Iron became the first mining company to access a Pilbara network via a third party agreement.

Rolling stock
To operate construction trains, four ex-Hamersley & Robe River railway C-636Rs were leased from Coote Industrial after overhaul in Perth, and a former Kowloon-Canton Railway EMD G12 locomotive leased from Chicago Freight Car Leasing Australia. As at February 2015, FMG operated 45 locomotives and 3,244 iron ore wagons.

As at October 2014, the locomotive fleet comprises 21 Electro-Motive Diesel SD70ACess 15 GE Dash 9-44CWs and nine former Union Pacific Railroad Electro Motive Diesel SD90s that were converted to SD70ACes. Seven rebuilt Union Pacific Railroad EMD SD90MAC-Hs Phase IIs were in transit from the United States.

References

External links
FMG website
Pilbara Railways – rail enthusiast website

Fortescue Metals Group
Iron ore railways
Mining railways in Western Australia
Railway lines in the Pilbara
Railway lines opened in 2008
Standard gauge railways in Australia
2008 establishments in Australia